Mehatpur Basdehra is a town and a Nagar Parishad Sub Tehsil in the Una District of the Indian state of Himachal Pradesh.

Demographics
At the time of the 2011 India census, Mehatpur Basdehra had a population of 9218. Males constituted 53% of the population and females 46%. Mehatpur Basdehra had an average literacy rate of 85.46%, higher than the state average of 82.80%: male literacy was 88.85% and female literacy 81.55%. 11.11% of the population was under 6 years of age.

References

Cities and towns in Una district